The inauguration of Joseph Estrada as the thirteenth president of the Philippines took place on Tuesday, June 30, 1998, at the Barasoain Church in Malolos, Bulacan. The oath of office was administered by Chief Justice of the Supreme Court of the Philippines Andres Narvasa. Afterwards, Estrada delivered his inaugural speech at the Quirino Grandstand in Manila. The inauguration was held during the Centennial of Philippine Independence. The Inauguration was organized jointly by the Presidential Transition Cooperation Team of outgoing President Fidel V. Ramos and the Transition Team of incoming President Estrada.

Estrada resigned amidst the Second EDSA Revolution on January 20, 2001, two years, six months, and twenty-one days into his term. The then Vice President Gloria Macapagal Arroyo assumed the office of President.

Context

Oath of office
Estrada took his oath office on June 30, 1998, at the Barasoain Church, in Malolos, Bulacan and as mandated by the Constitution, this took place at noon. This was the first time that the inauguration took place outside Manila. The Church was chosen to be the venue for the oath taking for paying tribute to the cradle of the First Republic. The oath of office was administered by Supreme Court Chief Justice Andres Narvasa, who also administered the oath of office of his predecessor, Fidel V. Ramos in 1992.

Inaugural events

Oath taking
As per tradition, the incoming president will fetch the outgoing president at the Malacañan Palace. However, incoming President Estrada and outgoing President Ramos arrived at the Bulacan State University on two separate Presidential choppers. After which, they rode the Presidential Car going to the Bulacan Provincial Capitol. After which, they witnessed a parade on the history of Bulacan. Afterwards, Ramos and Estrada rode a coach which are part of the parade leading to the Barasoain Church. There, Ramos was given final military honors, after which, they proceeded to the Church. The program started with the Philippine National Anthem and a prayer led by then-Archbishop of Cebu Cardinal Ricardo Vidal followed by a doxology. Vice President-elect Gloria Macapagal Arroyo was sworn in a few minutes prior to Estrada to secure the constitutional line of succession. At exactly 12:00 noon, Chief Justice Narvasa administered the oath of office to Estrada. Among those who witness the oath-taking was Estrada's mother, Mary Ejercito, his brothers and sisters as well as his long-time friend Fernando Poe, Jr. Also witnessed the oath-taking were former presidents Corazon Aquino and his predecessor Fidel V. Ramos. After which, former President Ramos was given departure honors and returned to the Bulacan State University while Estrada on board the Presidential car. Estrada proceeded to the Malacañang for the ceremonial climbing on the Grand Staircase and the induction of a new cabinet, and his first cabinet meeting.

Inauguration ceremony
The inaugural ceremony was held at the Quirino Grandstand in Manila, which was hosted by actors Robert Arevalo and Boots Anson-Roa. President Estrada arrived at the Grandstand and given military honors. The inaugural started at around 4:00 p.m. PST with the singing of the national anthem by Nora Aunor and the ecumenical prayer. Then, Executive Secretary Ronaldo Zamora introduced President Estrada and gave his inaugural address.

Presidency of Joseph Estrada
History of Bulacan
Estrada, Joseph
1998 in the Philippines